This is a list of Latvian Army generals that served during Latvian independence (1918–1940 and 1991–onwards).

 Eduards Aire (2 June 1876, Naukšēni parish – 28 May 1933, Riga), promoted 1926.
 Jānis Apinis (12 January 1867, Drabeši parish – 25 July 1925, Riga), promoted 1922.
 Žanis Bahs (6 October 1885, Sabile – 16 October 1941, Moscow), promoted 1936.
 Jānis Balodis (20 February 1881, Trikāta parish – 8 August 1965, Saulkrasti), promoted 1920.
 Krišjānis Berķis (26 April 1884, Īslīce parish – 29 July 1942, Perm), promoted 1925.
 Ludvigs Bolšteins (5 February 1888, Sesava parish – 21 June 1940, Riga), promoted 1935.
 Alberts Brambats (15 May 1881, Mujāni parish – 1943, unknown), Surgeon General, promoted 1933.
 Andrejs Bubinduss (12 August 1891, Kuldīga – 18 May 1942, Solikamsk), promoted 1940.
 Jānis Buivids (8 September 1864, Alkiškiai – 2 April 1937, Jūrmala), promoted 1924 (retired 1928).
 Hermanis Buks (15 January 1896, Ledurga parish – 18 August 1942, Moscow), promoted 1939.
 Arturs Dālbergs (18 July 1896, Riga – 26 October 1941, Moscow), promoted 1940.
 Roberts Dambītis (2 May 1881, Trikāta – 27 March 1957, Trikāta), promoted 1935 (retired 1939).
 Oskars Dankers (26 March 1883, Lielauce parish – 11 April 1965, Grand Rapids), promoted 1925.
 Arturs Dannebergs (17 February 1891, Ķoņi parish – 16 October 1941, Moscow), promoted 1935.
 Nikolajs Dūze (1 August 1891, Riga – 14 December 1951, Riga), promoted 1936 (retired 1940).
 Jānis Ezeriņš (17 November 1894, Prauliena parish – 16 March 1944, Kotlas), promoted 1936.
 Kārlis Ezeriņš (10 September 1868, Bauska parish – 29 September 1934, Riga), promoted 1916 (retired 1926).
 Kārlis Goppers (2 April 1876, Plāņi parish – 25 March 1941, Riga), promoted 1920 (retired 1934).
 Oto Grosbarts (31 January 1895, Kūrmale parish – 15 June 1945, Riga), promoted 1940.
 Mārtiņš Hartmanis (18 October 1882, Griķi parish – 27 July 1941, Moscow), promoted 1929.
 Aleksandrs Kalējs (26 February 1876, Alūksne – 14 February 1934, Riga), promoted 1927.
 Eduards Kalniņš (31 December 1876, Plātere parish – 28 June 1964, Los Angeles), promoted 1925 (retired 1935).
 Rūdolfs Klinsons (13 November 1889, Mālpils parish – 16 October 1941, Moscow), promoted 1936.
 Roberts Kļaviņš (10 November 1885, Graši parish – 16 October 1941, Moscow), promoted 1931 (retired 1934).
 Ādams Kreicbergs (16 April 1861, Dzirciems parish – 17 May 1933, Riga), promoted 1926.
 Andrejs Krustiņš (2 July 1884, Ungurmuiža parish – 16 October 1941, Moscow), promoted 1925.
 Jānis Kurelis (6 May 1882, Ērģeme parish – 5 December 1954, Chicago), promoted 1925 (retired 1940).
 Arnolds Kurše (7 January 1896, Rucava parish – 16 May 1953, Mariinsk), promoted 1940 (retired 1940).
 Jānis Lavenieks (12 June 1890, Skrīveri – 17 February 1969, New Brunswick, NJ), promoted 1939 (retired 1940).
 Augusts Misiņš (21 December 1863, Annenieki parish – 8 July 1940, Riga), promoted 1916 (retired 1920).
 Kazimirs Olekšs (26 July 1886, Bērzpils parish – 2 February 1970, Riga), promoted 1935 (retired 1936).
 Mārtiņš Peniķis (6 November 1874, Turlava parish – 28 February 1964, Riga), promoted 1920 (retired 1934).
 Jānis Priede (16 August 1874, Vestiena parish – 26 November 1969, Boston), promoted 1930 (retired 1931).
 Pēteris Radziņš (2 May 1880, Lugaži parish – 7 October 1930, Riga), promoted 1920.
 Hugo Rozenšteins (11 July 1892, Vecsalaca parish – 30 July 1941, Moscow), promoted 1935 (retired 1940).
 Jēkabs Ruškevics (9 February 1883, Jaunsvirlauka parish – 29 August 1942, Solikamsk), promoted 1925 (retired 1938).
 Dāvids Sīmansons (4 April 1859, Valmiera parish – 13 January 1933, Riga), promoted 1915 (retired 1925).
 Verners Tepfers (8 October 1893, Iecava – 22 November 1958, Stockholm), promoted 1937.
 Fricis Virsaitis (14 November 1882, Bukaiši parish – 24 May 1943, Vyatlag), promoted 1934 (retired 1940).

Sources 

Army generals